Ravulapadu is a village in Krishna district of the Indian state of Andhra Pradesh. It is the mandal headquarters of Pedaparupudi mandal in Nuzvid revenue division.

See also 
Villages in Pedaparupudi mandal

References

Villages in Krishna district